Oliver Richard Heald (born 13 March 1975) is a Canadian former professional footballer.

He signed with English club Port Vale in September 1993, but never made a first team appearance before moving on to Scarborough in May 1995. The next year, he returned to his hometown club, the Vancouver 86ers. He spent the next eight years in the A-League with the club, other than a brief spell with the Seattle Sounders in 1999. His only success with the club was when they topped the Western Conference table in 2000.

Career

England
Heald joined Port Vale, initially on trial, in September 1993, before he was offered a contract by manager John Rudge. The "Valiants" won promotion out of the Second Division in 1993–94 and competed in the First Division in 1994–95, though Heald never made a league appearance at Vale Park. He left on a free transfer to Ray McHale's Scarborough in the Third Division in May 1995. He only started three games for the "Seadogs" in 1995–96, but made eleven substitute appearances, scoring twice in all competitions.

Canada
Heald returned to his hometown in Canada to play for the Vancouver 86ers, who were competing in the A-League. The club failed to reach the playoffs in 1996, but reached the Conference final in 1997, where they were beaten by the Milwaukee Rampage following a penalty shootout. They reached the quarter-finals in 1998, where they lost to the San Diego Flash. He spent the 1999 season with the Seattle Sounders, who lost out to the San Diego Flash at the semi-final stage; Heald was sent off in the game. He returned to Vancouver, who would lose to the Minnesota Thunder in the semi-finals in 2000. Now called the Whitecaps, they won the Western Conference in 2001, but lost to the Hershey Wildcats in the playoff semi-finals. In 2002, they reached the Conference final, but lost to the Milwaukee Rampage after extra time. The next year, they lost to the Seattle Sounders in the division final following a penalty shootout; Heald successfully converted his penalty but Jeff Clarke's miss proved to be fatal. The 2004 season was the last of the A-League's existence, and the Whitecaps lost again to the Seattle Sounders in the Conference final.

Career statistics
Source:

Honours
Vancouver Whitecaps
A-League Western Conference: 2000

References

Soccer players from Vancouver
Canadian soccer players
Canada men's youth international soccer players
Canada men's under-23 international soccer players
Association football midfielders
Association football forwards
Canadian expatriate soccer players
Canadian expatriate sportspeople in England
Expatriate footballers in England
Port Vale F.C. players
Scarborough F.C. players
Vancouver Whitecaps (1986–2010) players
Seattle Sounders (1994–2008) players
English Football League players
A-League (1995–2004) players
1975 births
Living people